Mubayira is a small village in Mashonaland West province in Zimbabwe. It is southwest of the capital Harare.

Populated places in Mashonaland West Province